Kashkak or Keshkak or Keshgak or Keshkag may refer to:
 Keşkek, meat stew
 Keshkak, Golestan, Iran
 Kashkak, Lorestan, Iran
 Kashkak, Mazandaran, Iran
 Kashkak, Razavi Khorasan, Iran

See also
Kushkak (disambiguation)